Brabantia is a privately owned Dutch company which manufactures items for residential use such as waste bins, laundry racks, food storage containers and other products.

History
The company was founded in 1919 in Aalst, North Brabant, Netherlands, under the name van Elderen & Co, a company specialising in sheet metal fabrication. The name Brabantia is derived from the province of North Brabant, and was an early Van Elderen trade name.

CEO since 31 January 2012 is Tijn van Elderen.

Brabantia offers a range of some 500 houseware products in five core categories: waste storage, food storage, food preparation, laundry care and hardware, which includes post boxes and bathroom accessories. Since 1919, the company has grown and now has four production units employing 1,000 employees across 85 countries. It has annual turnover of around €150 million.

Still using steel as its prime manufacturing material, as well as a variety of high grade plastics, products continue to be made in-house in Belgium, Latvia and China, as well as an assembly and finishing plant in Nailsea in the UK.

The company has wholly owned subsidiaries in all key European markets including the United Kingdom, Belgium, France, Germany, Denmark, Switzerland, Spain, Italy and the United States with an export department covering other world markets.

Aims
The company markets its products on the basis of their supposed toughness and durability. According to its mission statement, it aims to develop products that are "Designed for Living”.

References

External links
 

Manufacturing companies of the Netherlands
Kitchenware brands
Dutch brands